Florence Anderson may refer to:

 Molly MacArthur (Florence Mary MacArthur, 1893–1972), later Anderson, English artist and stage designer
 Florence Anderson (trade unionist) (1871–1949), first female trade union secretary in Victoria, Australia
 Florence Anderson Clark (1835–1918), American author, newspaper editor, librarian, university dean